Laura Kreidberg is an American astronomer who primarily studies exoplanets. Since 2020, she has been director at the Max Planck Institute for Astronomy (MPIA) in Heidelberg, where she is setting up the Atmospheric Physics of Exoplanets (APEx) department.

Education and career 
Kreidberg studied physics and astronomy at Yale University, where she received her Bachelor of Science degree in 2011. In 2016, she received her PhD in astronomy and astrophysics from the University of Chicago. She was then an ITC Fellow and Junior Fellow of the Society of Fellows at Harvard University from 2016. From 2019 to 2020, she was a Clay Fellow at the Harvard-Smithsonian Center for Astrophysics. Since 2020, she has been Director at the MPI for Astronomy.

Work 
Kreidberg's area of work is the physics of exoplanet atmospheres. One focus is the observation of hot Jupiters and rocky planets by transmission and emission spectroscopy of transiting exoplanets.She is PI of two approved CYCLE 1 GO observing programs with the James Webb Space Telescope.

Honours and awards 
 Annie Jump Cannon Award, American Astronomical Society 2021
 Paul Hertelendy Lecturer, Harvard–Smithsonian Center for Astrophysics 2018
 International Astronomical Union Division F PhD Prize 2017
 Peter B. Wagner Memorial Award for Women in Atmospheric Sciences 2015
 George Beckwith Prize for excellence in astronomy, Yale Astronomy Department 2011

References

External links

 Website of Laura Kreidberg's department at MPIA
 Kreidberg's CV, PDF
 Lecture: "State of the Art in Exoplanet Atmosphere Observations"
 Journal articles by Laura Kreidberg in the ADS database
 Publications by Laura Kreidberg on the document server Researchgate

Max Planck Society people
American astrophysicists
21st-century American astronomers
Living people
Year of birth missing (living people)
Yale University alumni
University of Chicago alumni
American astronomers
Harvard University faculty